Brendan Littler (born 21 December 1965) is  a former Australian rules footballer who played with St Kilda in the Victorian Football League (VFL).

Notes

External links 
		

Living people
1965 births
Australian rules footballers from Victoria (Australia)
St Kilda Football Club players
Coburg Football Club players